Humerobatidae is a family of mites belonging to the order Sarcoptiformes.

Genera:
 Africoribates Evans, 1953
 Afroleius Mahunka, 1984
 Anellozetes Hammer, 1962
 Antarctozetes Balogh, 1961
 Diapterobates Grandjean, 1936
 Humerobates Sellnick, 1928
 Nuhivabates Niemi & Behan-Pelletier, 2004
 Ramsayellus Spain & Luxton, 1970
 Svalbardia Thor, 1930

References

Sarcoptiformes